Shafeeq Talwanga is an Indian actor, who has primarily worked in Malayalam, Telugu and Tamil films. He appears mainly in offbeat films.

His debut Malayalam film Love Story was a sensational hit and he was considered as a rival to Rahman, the romantic hero of Malayalam films. It was Shafeeq, who brought Break Dance movements in Malayalam films, but his subsequent movies like Naalae Njngalude Vivaham failed and he could not sustain his success.

His Tamil entry as Sanjay in Odangal also met lukewarm response. He later did low-budget films like Kalpana House.

In 90's, he rechristened himself as Varun Raj, grew a moustache and tried working again in Tamil films like Thoothu Po Chellakiliye, Padhukappu, Athipathi and Manivannan' s Gangai Karai Paattu, with little success. He has also done a Bollywood movie titled Khuli Khidki.

Partial filmography

References

External links
 

Living people
Male actors from Mumbai
Male actors in Tamil cinema
Male actors in Malayalam cinema
Indian male film actors
Year of birth missing (living people)
20th-century Indian male actors
Male actors in Hindi cinema
Male actors in Telugu cinema